Año Nuevo means New Year in the Spanish language, and refers to New Year's Eve in Latin American countries. There is a firework performance.

Places
 Año Nuevo Island, a small island off the coast of Northern California, between San Francisco and Santa Cruz
 Año Nuevo State Marine Conservation Area, a marine protected area off California's central coast
 Año Nuevo State Park, a California wildlife reserve located in San Mateo County
 Rancho Punta del Año Nuevo, a Mexican land grant in present-day San Mateo County, California